McKay Coppins (born February 2, 1987) is an American journalist and author who is a staff writer for The Atlantic. In 2012, Coppins was one of the Forbes magazine's "30 under 30" media pundits and listed along with three other young BuzzFeed News journalists as one of Politicos "ten breakout reporters of 2012." He is a regular contributor to CNN and MSNBC.

Coppins was raised in Holliston, Massachusetts. He graduated from Brigham Young University where he was editor of BYU's student newspaper, The Daily Universe.

Career
Coppins began his career at Newsweek and broke the story that Jon Huntsman Jr., would resign his ambassadorship and run for President.

Coppins joined BuzzFeed to cover the 2012 presidential race, becoming an important source on Governor Mitt Romney's Latter-day Saint (Mormon) faith. In the run-up to the 2016 presidential primaries, Coppins became embroiled in a public Twitter feud with Republican candidate Donald Trump after writing articles suggesting that Trump was running a "fake" campaign. In November 2016, he announced he was leaving BuzzFeed to join The Atlantic as a staff writer.

In 2015, Coppins published The Wilderness: Deep Inside the Republican Party's Combative, Contentious, Chaotic Quest to Take Back the White House. Walter Russell Mead favorably reviewed the book in Foreign Affairs, writing that it was "[w]idely sourced and compellingly written." He has an acrimonious relationship with President Donald Trump after he called his presidential aspirations a "sham"; Trump in response called him a  "dishonest slob".

Personal life
Coppins is a member of the Church of Jesus Christ of Latter-day Saints (LDS Church), in which he served a full-time mission, and he has often written about his faith. He and his wife were married in 2009 and have three children.

Coppins will release a biography of Mitt Romney called Romney: A Reckoning on October 24, 2023. The book will cover 25 years of American politics, based on 30 interviews with Romney and thousands of private emails, text messages, and diary entries.

References

External links
  published Feb 20, 2020 Amanpour and Company

21st-century American journalists
21st-century American writers
Latter Day Saints from Massachusetts
American political journalists
American political writers
American reporters and correspondents
The Atlantic (magazine) people
Brigham Young University alumni
Journalists from Massachusetts
Living people
Newsweek people
People from Holliston, Massachusetts
Writers from Massachusetts
BuzzFeed people
1987 births